Krupy may refer to the following places:
Krupy, Lublin Voivodeship (east Poland)
Krupy, Masovian Voivodeship (east-central Poland)
Krupy, West Pomeranian Voivodeship (north-west Poland)